This article details records relating to the Miami Dolphins NFL American football team.

Team records
Regular-season record (all-time) : 421–321–4 
Playoff record (all-time) : 20–21 (last appearance after 2016 season) 
Super Bowls won: 2 out of 5 appearances
Most games played: Dan Marino (–) – 242 games
Most victories : Dan Marino (–) – 147 victories
Winningest coach (all-time): Don Shula – 257 wins

Passing (season)
 Most pass attempts : Dan Marino – 623 attempts
 Most pass completions : Ryan Tannehill – 392 completions
 Most passing yards : Dan Marino – 5,084 yards
 Most passing touchdowns : Dan Marino – 48 touchdowns
 Most pass interceptions : Dan Marino – 23 INT
 Longest pass : Bob Griese – 86 yards

Passing (career)
 Most pass attempts : Dan Marino (–) – 8,358 attempts
 Most pass completions : Dan Marino (–) – 4,967 completions
 Most passing yards : Dan Marino (–) – 61,361 yards
 Most pass touchdowns : Dan Marino (–) – 420 touchdowns
 Moss pass interceptions : Dan Marino (–) – 252 interceptions
 Longest pass : Bob Griese (–) – 86 yards
 Most pass attempts in a rookie season : Ryan Tannehill – 504 attempts
 Most pass completions in a rookie season : Ryan Tannehill – 282 completions
 Most passing yards in a rookie season : Ryan Tannehill – 3,294 yards

Rushing (season)
 Most rushing attempts : Ricky Williams – 392 attempts
 Most rushing yards :  Ricky Williams – 1,853 yards
 Most rushing touchdowns : Ricky Williams – 16 touchdowns
 Longest rush : Lamar Miller – 97 yards
 Longest rush by a quarterback: Ryan Tannehill – 48 yards

Rushing (career)
 Most rush attempts : Ricky Williams (–) – 1,509 attempts
 Most rushing yards : Larry Csonka (–,) – 6,737 yards
 Most rushing touchdowns :  Larry Csonka (–,) – 53 touchdowns
 Longest rush : Lamar Miller (–) – 97 yards

Receiving (season)
 Most receptions : Tyreek Hill – 119 receptions
 Most receiving yards : Tyreek Hill – 1,710 yards
 Most receiving TDs : Mark Clayton – 18 TDs
 Longest reception : Paul Warfield – 86 yards
 Most receptions in a rookie season : Jaylen Waddle – 104 receptions

Receiving (career)
 Most receptions : Mark Clayton (–) – 550 receptions
 Most receiving yards : Mark Duper (–) – 8,869 yards
 Most receiving TDs : Mark Clayton (–) – 81 TDs
 Longest reception : Paul Warfield – 86 yards

Returns (career)
 Most punt return yards : Jake Scott (–) – 1,330 yards
 Most punt return TDs : Jakeem Grant (–) – 3 TDs
 Longest punt return : Jakeem Grant (–) – 88 yards
 Most kickoff yards : Wes Welker (–) – 3,756 yards
 Most kickoff TDs : Mercury Morris (–) – 3 touchdowns 
 Longest kickoff Return : Mercury Morris (–) – 105 yards

Defense (career)
 Most tackles : Zach Thomas (–) – 1,035 tackles
 Most sacks : Jason Taylor (–) – 131.0 sacks
 Most forced fumbles : Jason Taylor (–) – 48 fumbles
 Most interceptions : Jake Scott (–) – 35 interceptions

External links
 Dolphins all-time passing records
 Dolphins all-time rushing records
 Dolphins all-time receiving records

records
American football team records and statistics